Elias Van Breussegem (born 10 April 1992) is a Belgian cyclist, who currently rides for Belgian amateur team Shifting Gears.

Major results
2014
 1st  Time trial, National Under-23 Road Championships
2015
 4th Grote Prijs Stad Zottegem
2016
 1st Omloop Het Nieuwsblad U23
 7th Overall Le Triptyque des Monts et Châteaux
 9th Duo Normand (with Christophe Prémont)
2021 
 1st Dorpenomloop Rucphen

References

External links

1992 births
Living people
Belgian male cyclists
People from Oudenaarde
Cyclists from East Flanders
21st-century Belgian people